A casino is a facility that houses and accommodates certain types of gambling activities.

Casino may also refer to:

Places
 Casino, New South Wales, Australia
 Casino railway station, New South Wales, Australia
 The 20th-century electoral district of Casino in New South Wales, Australia
 Casino at Marino, in Dublin, Ireland
 Casinos, Valencia, a municipality in Spain
 The Casino Lakes in Idaho, United States
 The Casino, a bar in (Seattle)
 Casino Square, Monte Carlo, Monaco; at the Monte Carlo Casino
 Casino, on the Circuit de Monaco for the Monaco Grand Prix

People
 Albie Casiño (born 1993), Filipino actor
 Teodoro Casiño (born 1968), Filipino politician and communicator   
 David Casinos (born 1972), Spanish paralympian athlete

Arts, entertainment, and media

Games
 Casino (card game)
 Casino (video game) (1978), for Atari 2600

Music

Groups
Casino (band), English alternative rock band
 The Casinos, an American popular music group

Albums
 Casino (Al Di Meola album) (1978)
 Casino (Alcazar album) (2000)
 Casino (Blue Rodeo album) (1990)
 Casino (Iris album) (1999)
 Casino (Physical Therapy album) (1997)

Television
 Casino (game show), a Norwegian game show airing from 1989–1996 and 2003–2004
 The Casino (TV series), a 2004 American television reality show
 The Casino (web series), a 2020 Indian web series
 Casino (South Korean TV series), 2022 South Korean television series 
 "Casino" (Malcolm in the Middle episode), a television episode
 "Casino", an episode of the British sitcom SunTrap
 "Casino Royale" (1954 film), a 1954 television episode based on Ian Fleming's James Bond novel

Film
 The Casino (film), a 1972 Hong Kong drama directed by Cheung Chang Chak
 Casino (1980 film), directed by Don Chaffey
 Casino (1995 film), directed by Martin Scorsese
 Ho Kong Fung Wan or Casino, a 1998 Hong Kong biopic directed by Henry Fong Ping
 Casino (2020 film), a Bangladeshi crime film directed by Saikat Nasir

Other arts, entertainment, and media
 Casino (dance)

Brands and enterprises
 Casino Stadium, in Bregenz, Austria
 Epiphone Casino, an electric guitar model
 Groupe Casino,  a French corporation

Computing and technology
 Casino (computer virus), affecting systems running MS-DOS 
 CASINO, a quantum Monte Carlo code

Other uses
 Casino (cocktail), a gin cocktail
 Casino faction, a 19th-century German parliamentary alliance
 Casino Pier, an amusement park in Seaside Heights, New Jersey

See also
 Casina (architecture)
 Casino Theatre (disambiguation)
 Cassino, Italian commune
 Casio
 Kasino, Brazilian euro-dance act